The year 651 BC was a year of the pre-Julian Roman calendar. In the Roman Empire, it was known as year 103 Ab urbe condita . The denomination 651 BC for this year has been used since the early medieval period, when the Anno Domini calendar era became the prevalent method in Europe for naming years.

Events

Middle East 

 King Ashurbanipal defeats the Babylonian army of his half brother Shamash-shum-ukin and surrounds the fortified city of Babylon. Beginning a 3-year siege during which the Assyrians will defeat Shamash-shum-ukin's allies.
 King Teispes of Anshan (Persia) sends help to Shamash-shum-ukin but his heirs will later be obliged to accept Assyrian overlordship.

Asia 

 The Li Ji Unrest ends, resulting in the deaths of Li Ji, Xian, Xiqi and Zhuozi. After the revolt Duke Hui of Jin becomes ruler of the State of Jin.
 Zhou Xiang Wang becomes king of the Zhou Dynasty of China.

Births

Deaths 

 Li Ji, concubine and wife of Xian
 Xian, ruler of the State of Jin
 Xiqi, ruler of the State of Jin
 Zhuozi, ruler of the State of Jin

References